Sylvilagus leonensis,  the dwarf cottontail, is an extinct species of rabbit from the Late Pleistocene, known from the San Josecito Cave in Nuevo Leon, Mexico.

The dwarf cottontail was smaller than living cottontail species, comparable in size to the living pygmy rabbit.

References

Prehistoric lagomorphs
Prehistoric mammals of North America
Pleistocene mammals of North America
Pleistocene Mexico
Fossils of Mexico
leonensis